The Vanuatu Rugby Football Union, or VRFU, is the governing body for rugby union in Vanuatu. It was established in the 1960s, but only became fully affiliated to the International Rugby Board (IRB) in 1999.

The Vanuatu Rugby Football Union is a full member of the Federation of Oceania Rugby Unions (FORU), which is the regional governing body for rugby union in Oceania.

National teams

Vanuatu's national team, the Tuskers, has not yet played in a world cup  but has competed at the South Pacific Games, including winning a bronze medal for rugby 15s (as New Hebrides) in 1966. Vanuatu fields teams in 7s competitions as well as 15s. The national women's 7s team was established in 2011.

In 2015 the country sent an Under 20 team to the yearly regional tournament, Oceania Rugby Junior Trophy where the team would come against pacific neighbors like Fiji, Tonga and PNG. The team came into the competition with some confidence after boasting some top local players and led by their captain who was based in New Zealand the team was hungry for success. Unfortunately the team proved to be undersized compared to their much larger opposition eventually finishing the tournament with 0 wins, 3 losses and recording only 1 scored in the whole tournament. This proved to be a disappointment to the team who were looking to play with a high tempo game due to their smaller stature. Final results from the 3 round tournament are as follows:

Round 1: Tonga 81 Vanuatu 0, Fiji 63 Papua New Guinea 0
Round 2: Tonga 55 Papua New Guinea 16, Fiji 109 Vanuatu 6
Round 3: Fiji 19 Tonga 10, Papua New Guinea 80 Vanuatu 7

See also

 Vanuatu national rugby union team
 Vanuatu national rugby sevens team
 Vanuatu national under-20 rugby union team
 Vanuatu women's national rugby sevens team
 Rugby union in Vanuatu

External links
 Vanuatu Rugby Union on facebook.com
 Vanuatu on IRB.com
 Vanuatu on OceaniaRugby.com

Reference list

Rugby union in Vanuatu
Organisations based in Vanuatu
Rugby union governing bodies in Oceania